The Doordarshi Party (Hindi:  दूरदर्शी; also written as Door Darshi Party) was a political party in India. It was founded in Ahmedabad on 24 March 1980 by religious leader Baba Jai Gurudev on a platform of social reform and spiritual growth. The party did not receive significant support and withdrew from electoral politics in 1997.

Doordarshi Party Manifesto
The Doordarshi Party campaigned with pledges to address issues including:
	Reform of the Constitution of India
	Release of innocent people in prison
	Employment for every educated youth
	Abolition of octroi taxes
	Exemption of farmers from repayment of loans for agricultural purposes
	Limiting elected politicians to a single tenure of five years with enforced retirement at age 60
	Sale of lossmaking nationalized industries
	Clampdown on black money
	Lowering of the retirement age to 60, with immediate payment of all pension fund entitlement
       Banning labour union involvement in politics
	Introduction of a dowry system acceptable to all
       Intellectuals shall be given due respect that they deserve.
	India should pay off 
loans
	All nations should regard India as the supreme power.
	The respect and dignity of employees & officials should be restored.

All party candidates were required to be teetotal vegetarians.

Election results
The Doordarshi contested three General Elections to the Lok Sabha but won no seats.

References

Defunct political parties in India
Political parties established in 1980
1980 establishments in India
Political parties disestablished in 1997
1997 disestablishments in India